Doucouré or Doucoure is a surname. Notable people with the surname include:

Abdoulaye Doucouré (born 1993), French footballer
Amadou Doucoure (1919–1971), Malian politician
Aminata Doucouré (born 1994), French-Malian footballer
Boubacari Doucouré (born 1999), French footballer
Cheick Doucouré (born 2000), Malian footballer
Ladji Doucouré (born 1983), French track and field athlete
Lassana Doucouré (born 1988), French footballer
Maïmouna Doucouré (born 1985), French film director and screenwriter
Mahamadou Doucouré (born 2000), French footballer
Mamadou Doucouré (born 1998), French-Senegalese footballer
Mintou Doucoure (born 1982), Malian footballer
Sadio Doucouré (born 1992), French-Malian basketball player
Siriné Doucouré (born 2002), French footballer